An old mill is a type of amusement park ride with unaccompanied boats floated on guideways through dark tunnels. These themed dark rides originated in the late 19th century and are known by a variety of names, including tunnel of love and river cave. While generally considered a gentle ride, a variation that ends with a climactic splashdown, similar to the modern-day log flume, is known as a mill chute.

Tunnel of love

In its earliest incarnations, riders were taken by two-passenger boats through dark passages. There were two major themes: a relaxing romantic ride encouraging the couple to cuddle, or a spooky horror ride encouraging the couple to cling to one another. The darkness provided a degree of privacy and the frightening scenes offered a socially acceptable excuse for the physical contact at a time when public affection or even holding hands was considered inappropriate.

With the development of other socially acceptable opportunities and less stigma for unmarried couples to engage in physical contact, these rides became less popular and were either re-themed into children's attractions or torn down completely.

River caves

Riders travel slowly on themed boats along an artificial river that meanders through decorated caves and tunnels featuring different themed scenes of lighting, sounds, props, animatronics, or other visual effects. The boats drift along on a gentle current, typically generated by a paddle wheel.  This type of amusement ride became relatively common at amusement parks across the UK and the USA in the mid-20th century. The concept of the river cave is also very similar to those of the early scenic railways in that they attempt to be both educational and entertaining.

Once a popular feature of many amusement parks, river caves are now relatively rare and can be found in only a few locations, mainly in the UK and United States. Despite their popularity in the early to mid-20th century, the shift in focus to the thrill ride in the latter half of the 20th century onwards and the sheer age of the design and mechanics of these rides means that many have been dismantled and sold or destroyed altogether.

The ride's name stems from the fact that most were themed around caverns, with styrofoam stalagmites and stalactites housing detailed displays from around the world, through time and from myth and legend.

Mill chute

A "mill chute" is a variation of the old mill, featuring roller coaster-like drops at the end, in which riders get soaked. The major difference between the old mill and the mill chute is that the mill chute contains a drop at the end. Mill chutes have the same-styled grottos and caverns as old mills. Mill chutes were mainly manufactured in the 1920s and 1930s, while old mills were mainly manufactured in the late 19th century through the 1930s. Though old mills have drops, they are not as steep as the last drop on a mill chute (hence the name "chute"). The last drop on a mill chute ride is typically steeper than its first drop: though it is typical on roller coasters to have the steepest first drop, water rides have fiercer endings. The mill chute is considered the predecessor to the modern-day log flume.

Notable installations

 Table notes

In popular culture

In the 1928 film The Crowd, a tunnel of love is featured in which the sides are voyeuristically pulled down at a place where couples are likely to be kissing. The 1951 Alfred Hitchcock film Strangers on a Train features a tunnel of love ride that becomes the scene of a murder.

The tunnel of love was a favorite source of amusing scenes in Hanna-Barbera television series such as The Flintstones, The Jetsons, and Scooby-Doo, among others, often in a chase sequence gag in which rivals or combatants are shown entering the ride, then exiting in a romantic embrace. The tunnel of love has also been used in Disney cartoons, mainly a jealous Donald Duck storming the tunnel by foot and ruining the ride for a rival suitor and Daisy Duck.

In 1980, Dire Straits released a single entitled "Tunnel of Love" from their album Making Movies. Bruce Springsteen recorded an album called Tunnel of Love in 1987 and a song of the same name.

A 1990 episode of the TV series 21 Jump Street was called "Tunnel of Love".

A tunnel of love is seen in a 1996 episode of Hey Arnold! called Operation Ruthless. A tunnel of love is also seen in a 2008 episode of The Simpsons called Love, Springfieldian Style. A tunnel of love is seen in a 2010 episode of the show American Dad! called "May the Best Stan Win" and a tunnel of love is seen in a 2011 episode of the show SpongeBob SquarePants called "Tunnel of Glove".

In the graphic novel The Dark Knight Returns, an alternative future story published in 1986 that features the Batman supervillain Joker fighting with Batman in a tunnel of love and manages, after putting the superhero into a fit of rage, to frame Batman for murder of the Joker.

The video game Left 4 Dead 2's level Dark Carnival features a Tunnel of Love at the fictional Whispering Oaks Amusement Park. 

A tunnel of love is a location in the browser game Poptropica's quest titled Monster Carnival, available online from 2014 to 2020.

Gallery

See also

Log flume (ride)
Tow boat ride
Dark ride
List of incidents at independent amusement parks

References

External links
Demolition pictures of Dorney Park Old Mill

Water rides
Amusement rides introduced in 1901
Dark rides